Glyptaesopus xenicus is a species of sea snail, a marine gastropod mollusk in the family Borsoniidae.

Description
The size of an adult shell grows to a length of 6 mm to 8 mm.

Distribution
This species occurs in the Pacific Ocean from Mexico to Ecuador.

References
 Keen, A. M. 1971. Sea Shells of Tropical West America. Marine mollusks from Baja California to Peru, ed. 2. Stanford University Press. xv, 1064 pp., 22 pls.

External links
 
  Bouchet P., Kantor Yu.I., Sysoev A. & Puillandre N. (2011) A new operational classification of the Conoidea. Journal of Molluscan Studies 77: 273–308

xenicus
Gastropods described in 1932